In the geometry of hyperbolic 3-space, the order-3-7 hexagonal honeycomb or (6,3,7 honeycomb) a regular space-filling tessellation (or honeycomb) with Schläfli symbol {6,3,7}.

Geometry
All vertices are ultra-ideal (existing beyond the ideal boundary) with seven hexagonal tilings existing around each edge and with an order-7 triangular tiling vertex figure.

Related polytopes and honeycombs 
It a part of a sequence of regular polychora and honeycombs with hexagonal tiling cells.

Order-3-8 hexagonal honeycomb

In the geometry of hyperbolic 3-space, the order-3-8 hexagonal honeycomb or (6,3,8 honeycomb) is a regular space-filling tessellation (or honeycomb) with Schläfli symbol {6,3,8}. It has eight hexagonal tilings, {6,3}, around each edge. All vertices are ultra-ideal (existing beyond the ideal boundary) with infinitely many hexagonal tilings existing around each vertex in an order-8 triangular tiling vertex arrangement.

It has a second construction as a uniform honeycomb, Schläfli symbol {6,(3,4,3)}, Coxeter diagram, with alternating types or colors of tetrahedral cells. In Coxeter notation the half symmetry is [6,3,8,1+] = [6,((3,4,3))].

Order-3-infinite hexagonal honeycomb 

In the geometry of hyperbolic 3-space, the order-3-infinite hexagonal honeycomb or (6,3,∞ honeycomb) is a regular space-filling tessellation (or honeycomb) with Schläfli symbol {6,3,∞}. It has infinitely many hexagonal tiling {6,3} around each edge. All vertices are ultra-ideal (existing beyond the ideal boundary) with infinitely many hexagonal tilings existing around each vertex in an infinite-order triangular tiling vertex arrangement.

It has a second construction as a uniform honeycomb, Schläfli symbol {6,(3,∞,3)}, Coxeter diagram, with alternating types or colors of hexagonal tiling cells.

See also 
 Convex uniform honeycombs in hyperbolic space
 List of regular polytopes
 Infinite-order dodecahedral honeycomb

References 

Coxeter, Regular Polytopes, 3rd. ed., Dover Publications, 1973. . (Tables I and II: Regular polytopes and honeycombs, pp. 294–296)
 The Beauty of Geometry: Twelve Essays (1999), Dover Publications,  (Chapter 10, Regular Honeycombs in Hyperbolic Space) Table III
 Jeffrey R. Weeks The Shape of Space, 2nd edition  (Chapters 16–17: Geometries on Three-manifolds I,II)
 George Maxwell, Sphere Packings and Hyperbolic Reflection Groups, JOURNAL OF ALGEBRA 79,78-97 (1982) 
 Hao Chen, Jean-Philippe Labbé, Lorentzian Coxeter groups and Boyd-Maxwell ball packings, (2013)
 Visualizing Hyperbolic Honeycombs arXiv:1511.02851 Roice Nelson, Henry Segerman (2015)

External links 
John Baez, Visual insights: {7,3,3} Honeycomb (2014/08/01) {7,3,3} Honeycomb Meets Plane at Infinity (2014/08/14) 
 Danny Calegari, Kleinian, a tool for visualizing Kleinian groups, Geometry and the Imagination 4 March 2014. 

Honeycombs (geometry)
Hexagonal tilings
Infinite-order tilings
Isogonal 3-honeycombs
Isochoric 3-honeycombs
Order-3-n 3-honeycombs
Order-n-7 3-honeycombs
Regular 3-honeycombs